The Red Sea International Airport is an international airport under construction in Hanak, Tabuk in northwestern Saudi Arabia. Designed by British architects Foster + Partners, it is expected to be completed in 2023 and service one million passengers in 2030. The airport is part of a luxury and sustainable tourism megaproject in development called The Red Sea Project.

Background
The airport is purposely situated 20km from the coastal lagoons and islands that are also in development as part of The Red Sea Project, including Shurayrah Island and Amaala. The airport will be able to serve amphibious seaplanes with a dedicated water runway.

On 20 and 21 July 2022, the first flight tests were carried out at the airport.

References 

Airports in Saudi Arabia